The European Choral Association - Europa Cantat is a European choral organisation founded in 1963. It is the biggest European choral organisation with members in 40 European countries and 10 countries outside of Europe. It is a network of choir organisations (about 60), choirs and individual conductors, singers and choir managers in Europe. The group claims to directly represent more than 2,5 million of them, and indirectly reach 37 million.

Aims 
The European Choral Association - Europa Cantat aims at improving the quality of vocal music, supporting cultural diversity and promoting cultural exchange within Europe. It encourages the mobility of conductors, composers and singers, and the creation of innovative contemporary vocal music. It aims to make its activities accessible to young people from all European countries including those who are geographically, economically, socially or otherwise disadvantaged, with a special focus on young people under 27.

Services 
The association offers the following services:
Europa Cantat Festival, every three years
activities for choirs, young singers and conductors from Europe and overseas, on all levels
festivals and singing weeks 
vocal jazz days and showchoir weeks
Europa Cantat Junior for children's, girls' and boys' choirs
European academies for conductors and singers
international competition for conductors (under 30)
international study tours
EuroChoir for singers 18 to 30 
World Youth Choir for selected young singers (under 27) 
seminars for composers 
publications of songbooks
cooperation for composition competitions

References

External links
 European Choral Association - Europa Cantat official site

Choirs
Musical groups established in 1963
International organizations based in Europe
Music organizations based in Europe